Wang Lisan (24 March 1933 – 6 July 2013) was a Chinese composer and music educator, born in Wuhan, Hubei.His well-known works includes The Other Mountains(5 Prelude and Fugue), and Under the Sun.

References

1933 births
2013 deaths
People's Republic of China composers
Musicians from Wuhan